Jena is a German city.

Jena may also refer to:

Places
Jena, the second largest city in Thuringia, Germany
Jena, Alabama, an unincorporated community
Jena, Florida, an unincorporated community
Jena, Louisiana, a town in the United States; named for its German namesake
Jena (Oxford, Maryland), a home on the U.S. National Register of Historic Places
Jena, Bokaro, a town in Jharkhand, India
Jena, a village in Gavojdia Commune, Timiș County, Romania

People
Jena (given name), a list of people with this name
Jena (surname), a list of people so named
Jena Band of Choctaw Indians

Other
Battle of Jena, within Napoleonic battle of Jena–Auerstedt
 Jena Romanticism, the first phase of Romanticism in German literature 
Jena Symphony, a musical composition once attributed to Beethoven
University of Jena, Germany
 Jenaplan schools
Jena Observatory, Germany
526 Jena, an asteroid
Jena (framework), a Semantic Web framework

See also
Jenna
Iena (disambiguation)